Black powder cartridge refers to firearms ammunition from the period after the introduction of metallic cartridge, but prior to the wide adoption of smokeless powder. These cartridges (frequently but not always single-shot) had adopted the new technology of complete cartridges including a brass casing which held the powder charge, bullet, and primer. However, unlike almost all later firearms, these firearms used black powder as a propellant charge.

See also 
 Gunpowder

References 

Ammunition
Gunpowder